Asian Sunnis may refer to:

Ahl al-Hadith
Barelwi
Deobandi